In music, a common tone is a pitch class that is a member of, or common to (shared by) two or more chords or sets. Typically, it refers to a note shared between two chords in a chord progression. According to H.E. Woodruff:

The example below shows the seven diatonic triads of C major. The common tones between the tonic triad and the other six triads are highlighted in blue. As Woodruff describes, the tonic triad shares no common tones with either II and VII (consecutive to I), one common tone with IV and V (four and five degrees from I) each, and two common tones with III and VI (three and six degrees from I) each.

In voice leading 
Common tones are a consideration in voice leading and voicing. Abbé Vogler (1749–1814), Weber (1779–1839), Hauptmann (1792–1868), A. B. Marx (1795–1866), and earlier theorists emphasized "common-tone retention and smooth voice leading in... [their] treatment[s] of harmonic succession [chord progressions]" . It may be considered a guideline or a rule . 

The example below shows a circle progression in C major, in which common tones are retained in the second voice (alto).

Common-tone diminished seventh chord 
A diminished seventh chord may resolve to a chord whose root is common to both chords (e.g. ii7 resolves to I6). When this happens, the first chord is called a common-tone diminished seventh chord.

See also
Approach chord
Common chord (music)
Walkdown

References

Voice leading